Carl Kurtenecker (February 24, 1856 – December 15, 1943) was an American businessman and politician.

Born in Germany, Kurtenecker emigrated to the United States in 1869 and settled in La Crosse, Wisconsin in 1872. He was a printer and was in the book, newspaper, and stationery business. He was an executive for the John Gund Brewery Company and retired in 1918. Kurtenecker served as clerk of the Wisconsin Circuit Court for the La Crosse County, Wisconsin and was a tax commissioner. Kurtenecker served in the Wisconsin State Assembly in 1917 and 1919 and was a Republican. Kurtenecker died in La Crosse, Wisconsin.

Notes

1856 births
1943 deaths
German emigrants to the United States
Politicians from La Crosse, Wisconsin
Businesspeople from Wisconsin
County officials in Wisconsin
Republican Party members of the Wisconsin State Assembly